Wendy Mary Ann Mosquera (born 11 February 1995) is a Colombian karateka. She won one of the bronze medals in the women's kumite 68kg event at the 2019 Pan American Games held in Lima, Peru.

In 2021, she competed in the women's 68 kg event at the World Karate Championships held in Dubai, United Arab Emirates. She won one of the bronze medals in the women's team kumite event.

She won the gold medal in the women's 68 kg event at the 2022 Bolivarian Games held in Valledupar, Colombia. She won the silver medal in her event at the 2022 South American Games held in Asunción, Paraguay.

Achievements

References 

Living people
1995 births
Place of birth missing (living people)
Colombian female karateka
Pan American Games medalists in karate
Pan American Games bronze medalists for Colombia
Karateka at the 2019 Pan American Games
Medalists at the 2019 Pan American Games
South American Games silver medalists for Colombia
South American Games medalists in karate
Competitors at the 2022 South American Games
21st-century Colombian women